William Tatton Egerton, 1st Baron Egerton (30 December 1806 – 21 February 1883) was a British peer and politician from the Egerton family.

Egerton was the son of Wilbraham Egerton and his wife Elizabeth, daughter of Sir Christopher Sykes, 2nd Baronet. On his father's side he was descended in the female line from the Hon. Thomas Egerton, of Tatton Park, youngest son of John Egerton, 2nd Earl of Bridgewater. He was educated at Eton College. He was returned to Parliament as one of two representatives for Lymington in 1830, a seat he held until 1831, and then represented Cheshire North from 1832 to 1858. He was a major landowner in the Manchester area and a benefactor to Chorlton-cum-Hardy. In 1859 Egerton was raised to the peerage as Baron Egerton, of Tatton in the County Palatine of Chester. He later served as Lord-Lieutenant of Cheshire from 1868 to 1883.

Personal life 
Lord Egerton married Lady Charlotte Elizabeth, daughter of John Loftus, 2nd Marquess of Ely, on 18 December 1830.

They had three children:
 Wilbraham Egerton, 1st Earl Egerton
 Alan Egerton, 3rd Baron Egerton
 Beatrix, m. Lionel Tollemache, son of John Tollemache, 1st Baron Tollemache.

Lady Charlotte died in 1878. Egerton survived her by five years and died in February 1883, aged 76. He was succeeded in the barony by his eldest son Wilbraham, who was created Earl Egerton in 1897.

Notes

References

External links 
 

1806 births
1883 deaths
People educated at Eton College
Barons in the Peerage of the United Kingdom
Lord-Lieutenants of Cheshire
Egerton, William Tatton
Egerton, William Tatton
Egerton, William Tatton
Egerton, William Tatton
Egerton, William Tatton
Egerton, William Tatton
Egerton, William Tatton
Egerton, William Tatton
Egerton, William Tatton
UK MPs who were granted peerages
William
Peers of the United Kingdom created by Queen Victoria
Hulme Trust
Tatton family